Caribair was a Puerto Rican airline based in San Juan, Puerto Rico, that served over a dozen destinations in the Caribbean as well as Miami.  In 1970, the air carrier was serving 16 destinations on 14 Caribbean islands, plus Miami.  The airline offered McDonnell Douglas DC-9-30 jet service via a number of intermediate stops including San Juan (SJU) for its direct flight  services between Miami (MIA) and Port of Spain, Trinidad.  Caribair was the first Puerto Rico-based airline to operate jet aircraft on scheduled passenger services.  The air carrier was acquired by Eastern Air Lines in 1973.

History
The history of Caribair dates to Powelson Airlines (aka, the Powelson Line and Powelson Air Service), an airline founded in 1938 by Dennis Powelson, a former pilot for Destileria Serralles in Ponce. On 27 February 1939, Powelson Air Service changed its name to Caribbean-Atlantic Airlines (aka, Caribair) simultaneous with the incorporation of Caribair. In 1946 Mr. Powelson sold Caribbean-Atlantic Airlines (Caribair) to Dionisio, Benigno and Juan Trigo, three Puerto Rican brothers with an import-export business and business interests in Spain.  Caribair dissolved in 1973 when it was purchased by Eastern Airlines.

The Caribair service was popular both with local residents and tourists alike, traveling between Puerto Rico and other Caribbean islands. By 1950, the airline's name had officially changed to Caribair and service to the Dominican Republic were initiated.  Caribair continued to expand during the 1950s and 1960s, and by 1962, the Puerto Rico-based airline was serving a number of international destinations including Santo Domingo, Guadeloupe, St. Thomas, St. Croix and St. Maarten. Domestic destinations included Mayaguez and Ponce. In the early 1960s, Caribair began operating select flights on behalf of Eastern Airlines using Convair 640 turboprop aircraft. In order to compete with an increase in flight activity from other airlines, including British West Indian Airways (BWIA) and Leeward Islands Air Transport (LIAT), Caribair put into service new McDonnell Douglas DC-9-30 jetliners, becoming the first Puerto Rico-based airline to offer modern jet service.

Destinations

The following destination information is taken from the Caribair system timetable dated April 1, 1970.  According to this timetable, Caribair was operating all scheduled passenger flights at this time with McDonnell Douglas DC-9-30 jetliners as the airline's Convair 640 turboprop aircraft had been withdrawn from scheduled services.

 Bridgetown, Barbados (BGI)
 Castries, St. Lucia - Vigie Airport, now known as George F.L. Charles Airport (SLU)
 Fort-de-France, Martinique (FDF)
 Kingston, Jamaica (KIN)
 Miami, Florida (MIA)
 Montego Bay, Jamaica (MBJ)
 Oranjestad, Aruba (AUA)
 Pointe-a-Pitre, Guadeloupe (PTP)
 Port-au-Prince, Haiti (PAP)
 Port of Spain, Trinidad (POS)
 Santo Domingo, Dominican Republic (SDQ)
 St. Croix, U.S. Virgin Islands (STX)
 St. John's, Antigua (ANU)
 St. Maarten (SXM)
 St. Thomas, U.S. Virgin Islands (STT)
 San Juan, Puerto Rico (SJU) - Home Base
 Willemstad, Curacao (CUR)

In 1968, Caribair was operating a mixed fleet consisting of both McDonnell Douglas DC-9-30 jets and Convair 640 turboprops with the latter being used to provide scheduled flights into destinations that were either operationally constrained with regard to DC-9 service or simply could not support the passenger numbers required for profitable jet operations.  A number of these destinations were eliminated from the Caribair route system when the airline decided to operate only DC-9 jet service.  These former destinations included the islands of Dominica, Grenada, St. Vincent and St. Kitts as well as Mayaguez, Dorado and Ponce on the island of Puerto Rico.

Historical fleet

Douglas DC-3                      (11 aircraft) - this was also the workhorse of the Caribair fleet well into the 1960s, making regular jaunts between San Juan, Ponce and Mayagüez, particularly before the construction of modern highways on the island.
McDonnell Douglas DC-9-31       (3 aircraft) - The DC-9 was the only jet aircraft type operated by Caribair.
Convair CV-340                    (9 aircraft)
Convair CV-440 (leased)           (2 aircraft)
Convair CV-640                    (7 aircraft) - The CV-640 was the only turboprop aircraft type operated by Caribair.
Lockheed Model 50 (leased)                              (2 aircraft)
Stinson SM-6000-A/B                                     (5 aircraft)

Alleged UFO sightings
In June 1970, the Puerto Rican Air National Guard apparently received reports from a Caribair jet as well as from a Pan American World Airways (Pan Am) jetliner concerning a mysterious object in the air. Pilots in both aircraft claimed to have seen an unidentified flying object (UFO) close to San Juan's Isla Verde International Airport. The Federal Aviation Administration (FAA) released a statement about this incident in 1977.

See also 
 List of defunct airlines of the United States

References

External links

Caribair
Caribair timetables
Caribair photos
Fleet Data
Accident report

Defunct airlines of Puerto Rico
Economic history of Puerto Rico
Airlines established in 1939
Airlines disestablished in 1973
1939 establishments in Puerto Rico